Canadian singer and songwriter Shawn Mendes has won more than 122 awards during his career. His debut album Handwritten was released in 2015 and debuted at No. 1 on the US Billboard 200 chart and nominated for Album of the Year award at Juno Awards. Mendes is also awarded the Allan Slaight Honor from the Canadian Walk of Fame. He won Favorite Breakout Artist award at the 42nd People's Choice Awards.

His second studio album Illuminate was released in 2016 and spawned the singles "Treat You Better" and "Mercy" and in 2017 Mendes released "There's Nothing Holdin' Me Back" as the third single in his second studio album and received a Juno Award and MTV Europe Music Award. At the 2017 American Music Awards Mendes won the American Music Award for Favorite Adult Contemporary Artist and latter won the same award in 2018 ceremony.

In 2018, Mendes released his self-titled third studio album, releasing the single "In My Blood". Mendes has been nominated for three awards at the 2018 MTV Video Music Awards. Mendes was named the inaugural Artist of the Year award at the 2018 Billboard Live Music Awards.  Mendes was nominated for two awards at the 61st Annual Grammy Awards for Best Pop Vocal Album and "In My Blood" for Song of the Year. Mendes was nominated for 6 awards at the 2019 Juno Awards winning five of them including Album of the Year and Single of the Year for "In My Blood" making Mendes the 4th artist to win Single of the Year for two consecutive year tied with Anne Murray, Glass Tiger and Alanis Morissette. Mendes was nominated for six awards at 2019 MTV Video Music Awards, winning two for "Señorita". Mendes was nominated for five awards at the 2019 Teen Choice Awards winning three awards. Mendes was nominated for four awards at the 45th People's Choice Awards winning two awards. Mendes was nominated for 6 awards at the 2019 MTV Europe Music Awards winning the Artist of the Year award. In November 2019 Mendes was nominated in 62nd Annual Grammy Awards for Best Pop Duo/Group Performance. Mendes was nominated for two American Music Award winning Collaboration of the Year award for "Señorita". In January 2020 Mendes was nominated for seven awards at the 2020 iHeartRadio Music Awards tying with Billie Eilish also with seven nominations latter that month Mendes was nominated for awards at the 2020 Juno Awards. In June 2020 Mendes won the Juno Award for Single and Artist of the Year making Mendes the first artist in the Juno Awards history to win the Single of the Year award for third consecutive year and the second artist to win the Artist of the Year award for two consecutive year tied with The Weeknd who won the award in 2015 and 2016. Mendes won five awards at the SOCAN Awards in September 2020 which makes him the most awarded creator in a single year at the SOCAN Awards since its launched in 1990. Mendes also won the Juno Award (Fans Choice) in 2021. 

In 2022 Mendes received the Juno International Achievement Award which recognizes Canadian artists who have attained exemplary success on the world stage. He became the youngest recipient of this award and also became the eighth person to receive this honor joining Alanis Morissette, Arcade Fire, Bryan Adams, Celine Dion, Drake, Sarah McLachlan and Shania Twain

Awards and nominations

Other accolades

State and cultural honors

Listicles

Notes

References

Mendes, Shawn
Awards